The 1990 3. divisjon, the third highest association football league for men in Norway. From 1991, the third tier was renamed as 2. divisjon.

22 games were played in 6 groups, with 3 points given for wins and 1 for draws. Drøbak/Frogn, Elverum, Haugar, Fana, Surnadal and Tromsdalen were promoted to the 2. divisjon. Number ten, eleven and twelve were relegated to the 4. divisjon.

League tables

Group A

Group B

Group C

Group D

Group E

Group F

Norwegian Third Division seasons
3
Norway